Marton Mere is a mere (lake) and Local Nature Reserve in Blackpool, Lancashire, England. It is located near to the Blackpool districts of Marton and Mereside and the village of Staining. It is recognised as a Site of Special Scientific Interest. It supports various habitats such as open water, reed beds, grassland as well as pockets of woodland and scrub.

The mere is a glacial freshwater lake. It was drained further when Main Dyke was cut around 1850.

The reserve is adjacent to Marton Mere Holiday Village.

References

External links

Further reading

Blackpool
Lakes of Lancashire
Local Nature Reserves in Lancashire
Sites of Special Scientific Interest in Lancashire
Protected areas of Lancashire